Oxycilla tripla is a species of moth in the family Erebidae. It is found in North America.

The MONA or Hodges number for Oxycilla tripla is 8405.

References

Further reading

 
 
 

Rivulinae
Articles created by Qbugbot
Moths described in 1896